Anton Vladimirovich Grebnev (born 16 May 1984) is a Russian former professional football player.

He made his debut in the Russian Premier League in 2001 for FC Sokol Saratov.

References

1984 births
Sportspeople from Saratov
Living people
Russian footballers
Russia under-21 international footballers
Association football midfielders
FC Sokol Saratov players
Russian Premier League players
FC Rotor Volgograd players
FC Baikal Irkutsk players